SAMRO, the Southern African Music Rights Organisation, is a copyright asset management society. It was established by the South African Copyright Act, and aims to protect the intellectual property of music creators by licensing music users, collecting licence fees and distributing royalties to music creators. SAMRO represents more than 15,000 Southern African music composers, lyricists/authors and music publishers. The organisation administers  performing rights.

History
The Southern African Music Rights Organisation (name since 1974) was formed in December 1961 under the chairmanship of Dr. Gideon Roos Senior, a former Director-General of the South African Broadcasting Corporation (SABC).

SAMRO began operations in January 1962 with 40 South African composers and 13 music publishers, taking over from the UK royalty collecting society PRS. In June 1962, SAMRO was accepted as a member of the International Confederation of Societies of Authors and Composers (CISAC). In the same year, Strike Vilakazi, the composer of the anti-apartheid song Meadowlands became the first black member of SAMRO.

In 2012, SAMRO commemorated its 50th anniversary with a series of events, including the Builders’ Awards, which recognised musicians, staff members and others who had contributed to the organisation over the years.

In 2013, SAMRO launched the Wawela Music Awards to pay tribute to South African composers who have made a significant contribution on the international and local music scene.

On 1 May 2013, SAMRO converted from a company limited by guarantee (a corporate form no longer supported by the Companies Act 71 of 2008) to a Non Profit Company, and now operates under the name of Southern African Music Rights Organisation NPC.

In March 2014, SAMRO announced the transfer of its mechanical rights licensing operation to CAPASSO (Composers Authors and Publishers Association), as recommended by the 2012 Copyright Review Commission Report.

Global affiliations

SAMRO has reciprocal agreements with 225 collecting societies in 150 countries allowing it to collect music royalties on behalf of its members around the world.

SAMRO is a member of the International Confederation of Societies of Authors and Composers (CISAC). SAMRO is involved in CISAC initiatives in Africa, including projects affiliated with the World Intellectual Property Organization (WIPO), and the United Nations Educational, Scientific and Cultural Organisation (UNESCO). SAMRO is also accredited with BIEM, an organisation co-ordinating statutory license agreements among different countries.

SAMRO is associated with industry trade fairs and music showcases such as MIDEM in France and the World Music Expo (WOMEX), as well as with bodies such as the South African Music Export Council (SAMEX).

Controversies 
In 2019 the Southern African Music Rights Organisation (SAMRO) sued a number of former executives for unlawful enrichment. According to the court case, the members of the leadership of SAMRO overpaid themselves by more than R1.6 Million rand. Sipho Mabuse, Sibongile Khumalo, Loyiso Bala, Arthur Mafokate, Relebogile Mabotja, Gabi Le Roux, Jack Jeremiah Mnisi, Rowlin Naicker, Jordaan Niemand, John Edmond and Jeanette Zaidel-Rudolph were implicated in the irregular expenditure. 

SAMRO would later become the centre of a scandal regarding the underpayment of royalties to artists, much of this taking place during this leadership's time working for the organisation.

See also
 Copyright collective
 Copyright law of South Africa
 Performance rights organisation

References

Music industry associations
Organisations based in Johannesburg
Music organisations based in South Africa
1961 establishments in South Africa
Organizations established in 1961